Fleury Michon IV was a 42-foot waterline length catamaran that was sailed across the Atlantic ocean in 1981.

See also
List of multihulls
Fleury Michon

References

Individual catamarans
1980s sailing yachts